Kyudo Nakagawa (中川 球童, February 12, 1927—December 29, 2007), or Nakagawa Kyūdō, was a Japanese-born Rinzai rōshi who for many years led Soho Zen Buddhist Society, Inc. in Manhattan's Lower East Side.

Biography
A Dharma heir of the late Soen Nakagawa—who is of no familial relation—Kyudo first became a Zen monk at age eight. He undertook Buddhist studies at Japan's renowned Komazawa University and entered Gukei-ji. Then, at age thirty, Kyudo entered Ryūtaku-ji temple and trained under Soen Nakagawa. In 1968 he moved to Jerusalem to lead a center Soen had opened in Israel called Kibutsu-ji, where he stayed on for thirteen years. Kyudo then returned to Ryūtaku-ji briefly and moved to New York City, where he led the Soho Zen Buddhist Society, Inc. He also made occasional trips to England now and then to lead the London Zen Society.

After Soen Roshi's death in 1984, Sochu Suzuki Roshi became abbot of Ryūtaku-ji. When Sochu Roshi died in 1990, Kyudo became abbot of Ryūtaku-ji. He died on December 29, 2007, at the age of eighty. The Soho Zen Buddhist Society, Inc. in Manhattan closed its practice center, the Soho Zendo at 464 West Broadway, following Kyudo's death. Among others, he trained Lawrence Shainberg, author of Ambivalent Zen, which discusses Kyudo's teachings and provides an intimate portrait of this Zen master.

See also
Buddhism in Japan
List of Rinzai Buddhists
Timeline of Zen Buddhism in the United States

Notes

References

External links
Black Moon Zendo
Engaged-zen.org

Japanese religious leaders
Komazawa University alumni
Zen Buddhist abbots
Rinzai Buddhists
Japanese Zen Buddhists
1927 births
2007 deaths
Rōshi
20th-century Buddhist monks
People from Hyōgo Prefecture